Kevin O'Byrne (born 16 April 1991) is an Irish rugby union player for English club Ealing Trailfinders in the RFU Championship. He plays as a hooker.

Early life
He captained the Munster under-18s club side during the 2008–09 inter-provincials and was part of Highfield under-18s All-Ireland winning squad in 2009.

Career

Munster
O'Byrne made his Munster debut on 5 September 2014, starting against Edinburgh in the first game of the 2014–15 Pro12 season. He signed a one-year development contract with Munster in March 2015. On 3 September 2016, O'Byrne went off injured in Munster's 2016–17 Pro12 fixture against Scarlets. He was subsequently ruled out for 3 months with an elbow injury.

O'Byrne made his European Rugby Champions Cup debut for Munster on 21 October 2017, doing so when he came on as a replacement for Rhys Marshall in the round 2 fixture against Racing 92. He scored his first try for Munster on 3 November 2017, having come on as a replacement in the 2017–18 Pro14 fixture against Welsh side Dragons, which Munster won 49–6.

He signed a two-year contract extension with Munster in January 2018. He earned the Man-of-the-Match award in Munster's 30–26 away win against South African side Cheetahs during the 2018–19 Pro14 on 4 November 2018. O'Byrne won his 50th cap for Munster in their opening 2019–20 Pro14 fixture against Welsh side Dragons on 28 September 2019, a match Munster won 39–9.

He signed a two-year contract extension with Munster in March 2020, a deal that will see O'Byrne remain with the province until at least June 2022. O'Byrne was rewarded for a series of strong performances by being named in the 2020–21 Pro14 Dream Team. O'Byrne will depart Munster at the end of the 2021–22 season.

Ealing Trailfinders
O'Byrne will join English RFU Championship side Ealing Trailfinders from the 2022–23 season.

Honours

Individual
United Rugby Championship Dream Team: 2020–21

References

External links
Munster Profile
URC Profile

Living people
1991 births
People educated at Presentation Brothers College, Cork
Rugby union players from County Cork
Irish rugby union players
UL Bohemians R.F.C. players
University College Cork RFC players
Cork Constitution players
Munster Rugby players
Ealing Trailfinders Rugby Club players
Irish expatriate rugby union players
Expatriate rugby union players in England
Irish expatriate sportspeople in England
Rugby union hookers